Frances S. Ligler (born June 11, 1951) is a biochemist and bioengineer who was a 2017 inductee of the National Inventors Hall of Fame. Ligler's research dramatically improved the effectiveness of biosensors while at the same time reducing their size and increasing automation. Her work on biosensors made it easier to detect toxins and pathogens in food, water, or when airborne.

In a 2017 interview, Ligler summarized her work: "Optical biosensors is a whole field where biological molecules are being used for recognition and transduce an optical signal to a small device.  My teams and I demonstrated the use of optical biosensors for detection of pathogens in food, infectious diseases in people, biological warfare agents, environmental pollutants, explosives and drugs of abuse — things that can kill you." Ligler's interests include microfluidics, tissue on chips, optical analytical devices, biosensors and nanotechnology. Ligler holds 37 patents and has authored over 400 scientific papers.

Biography
Ligler received a B.S. from Furman University and a D.Phil. and D.Sc. from Oxford University. In 1986, she joined the US Naval Research Laboratory, where she developed sensors to detect anthrax and botulinum toxin that were deployed during Operation Desert Storm.

In 2013, she left the US Naval Research Laboratory to become the Lampe Distinguished Professor of Biomedical Engineering in the Joint Department of Biomedical Engineering at North Carolina State University and the University of North Carolina at Chapel Hill. She received honorary doctorates from the Agricultural University of Athens, Greece in 2014 and from Furman University in 2018.  In 2022, she became Professor and Eppright Chair in Biomedical Engineering at Texas A&M University.

Awards and honors
1992, Office of National Drug Control Policy Technology Transfer Award for Drug Enforcement
1993, Hillebrand Prize, Chemical Society of Washington, D.C.
1997, U.S. Women in Science and Engineering (WISE) Scientific Achievement Award
2000, Fellow, SPIE
2000, Navy Superior Civilian Service Award
2003, Christopher Columbus Foundation Homeland Security Award (Biological, Radiological, Nuclear Field)
2003, Presidential Rank of Distinguished Senior Professional, awarded by President George W. Bush
2005, Elected Member, U.S. National Academy of Engineering
2006, Distinguished Furman Alumni of the 20th Century
2009, Partnership for Public Service's Service to America Medals Finalist, Career Achievement
2012, Presidential Rank of Meritorious Senior Professional, awarded by President Barack H. Obama
2012, Elected Fellow, American Institute for Medical and Biological Engineering
2013, Elected Fellow, American Association for the Advancement of Science
2014, Honorary doctorate, Agricultural University of Athens, Greece
2016, Carl Kohrt Distinguished Alumni Award, Furman University
2016, Elected Fellow, National Academy of Inventors
2017, Award for Distinguished Service in the Advancement of Analytical Chemistry, ACS Division of Analytical Chemistry
2017, Honorary Member, Hellenic Society for Nanotechnology in Health Sciences
2017, Inductee, National Inventors Hall of Fame
 2018, Honorary doctorate, Furman University
2020, Simon Ramo Founders Award, National Academy of Engineering
2022, National Award in Analytical Chemistry, American Chemical Society

References

External links 
 United States patent 5077210 for immobilization of active agents on substrates with a silane and heterobifunctional crosslinking agent

1951 births
Living people
Members of the United States National Academy of Engineering
American women biochemists
Furman University alumni
Academics of the University of Oxford
North Carolina State University faculty
University of North Carolina at Chapel Hill faculty
American biomedical engineers
American women academics
21st-century American women
Texas A&M University